Ventenac-en-Minervois is a commune in the Aude department in southern France.

Population

See also
Communes of the Aude department

References

External links

Peasant uprising 
Aude portal 

Communes of Aude